Moyaliff (historically Moaliffe "Mealiff", from ) is an old Civil Parish and townland in County Tipperary, Ireland.  The old Civil parish was in the barony of Kilnamanagh Upper in the County of Tipperary. It had thirty one townlands in total. Twenty seven of these townslands are in the Roman Catholic Parish of Upperchurch-Drombane, three in the Roman Catholic parish of Holycross-Ballycahill and one townland Moyaliff itself shared between the two.

The name is composed of two Irish words: 'Maigh', meaning "plain" and "Ailbhe" which is the Gaelic word of Alvy giving the full name of Maigh Ailbhe which directly translates to Alvy's Plain.

Townlands
Áth Longfoirt/Allengort, 
Béal Átha an Oidhre/Ballynera, 
Béal Átha hUachtair/Ballyoughter, 
An Cillín Liath/Killinleigh, 
An Cláirín/Clareen, 
Cluain Uí Thorpa/Clonyharp, 
Cnoc an Charna Duibh/Knockacarhanduff Commons, 
Coill Pennefather/Pennefatherswood, 
Cúil na Muine/Coolnamoney, 
An Chúlchoill/Coolkill, 
Currach na Tinne/Curraghnatinny, 
An Drom Bán/Drumbane, 
Drom Daibhche/Drumdiha, 
Dromainn an Ghabhair/Drumminagower, 
Dromainn Philib/Drumminphilip, 
Dúraí/Dooree Commons, 
Faill an Ghabhail/Foilagoule, 
An Ghléib/Glebe, 
Goirtín an Phóire/Gorteenaphoria, 
Gort an Chuaille/Gortahoola, 
Leacain Dara/Lackandarra, 
An Lisín/Lisheen, 
Maigh Ailbhe/Moyaliff, 
Ros Caoin Beag/Roskeen Little, 
Ros Caoin Theas/Roskeen South, 
Ros Caoin Thuaidh/Roskeen North, 
Ros Caoin/Roskeen, 
Ros Moilt/Rosmult, 
Ros na gCeanannaí/Rosnacananee, 
An Seanbhaile Dubh/Shanballyduff, 
Tuairín Cuileannach/Tooreencullinagh.

Historical Baroney
According to the Down Survey of Ireland part of the historical parish of Moyaliff then known as Moaliffe was in the now defunct barony of Killnelongurty.

See also
Walter Butler of Nodstown

References

External links
Moyaliffe Tithes
Welcome to Ireland Reaching Out Parish of Moyaliff.
Moyaliffe House

Civil parishes of Kilnamanagh Upper